Nubi Gewog (Dzongkha: ནུ་སྦིས་) is a gewog (village block) of Trongsa District, Bhutan.

References

Gewogs of Bhutan
Trongsa District